The 1991 Spengler Cup was held in Davos, Switzerland from December 26 to December 31, 1991.  All matches were played at HC Davos's home arena, Eisstadion Davos. The final was won 5-2 by CSKA Moscow over HC Lugano.

Teams participating
 CSKA Moscow
 HC Lugano
 Team Canada
 Malmö IF
 Mannheimer ERC

Tournament

Round-Robin results

Finals

External links
Spenglercup.ch

1991-92
1991–92 in Swiss ice hockey
1991–92 in Soviet ice hockey
1991–92 in Canadian ice hockey
1991–92 in German ice hockey
1991–92 in Swedish ice hockey
December 1991 sports events in Europe